Vicky Riback-Wilson (born August 24, 1946) is a former American Democrat politician who served in the Missouri House of Representatives.

Born in Columbia, Missouri, she graduated from the University of Pennsylvania with a bachelor's degree in English and from the University of Missouri with a master's degree in higher and adult education.  She served as a Peace Corps volunteer in Uganda.

Vicky Riback-Wilson served as a coordinator for the University of Missouri's Fellowships Office, as assistant director of the Missouri Cultural Heritage Center, and as associate director of the Missouri Rural Innovation Institute.

References

1946 births
Living people
20th-century American politicians
21st-century American politicians
20th-century American women politicians
21st-century American women politicians
Democratic Party members of the Missouri House of Representatives
Women state legislators in Missouri
University of Missouri alumni